The 2009–10 season of the Frauen-Bundesliga is the 20th season of Germany's premier women's football league. It started on 20 September 2009 and ended on 9 May 2010. On the 21st day of play Turbine Potsdam claimed the championship thus defending their title from the previous season. Tennis Borussia Berlin and SC Freiburg will be relegated to the second tier.

Final standings

Results

Top scorers

References 

Frauen-Bundesliga seasons
Ger
1
Women1